Marion Township is one of thirteen townships in Jasper County, Indiana, United States. As of the 2010 census, its population was 7,571 and it contained 2,989 housing units.

History
Charles Halleck Student Center, Hugh and Leona Rank House, and Schwietermann Hall were listed on the National Register of Historic Places in 2016.

Geography

Cities and towns
 Collegeville
 Rensselaer (the county seat)

Unincorporated towns
 North Marion
 Pleasant Ridge
 South Marion

Adjacent townships
 Barkley Township (northeast)
 Hanging Grove Township (east)
 Milroy Township (southeast)
 Jordan Township (southwest)
 Newton Township (west)
 Union Township (northwest)

Cemeteries
The township contains three cemeteries: Crockett, Mount Calvary and Weston.

Major highways
  U.S. Route 231
  Indiana State Road 16
  Indiana State Road 114

Airports and landing strips
 Borntraeger Airstrip
 Jasper County Airport

Education
Marion Township residents are eligible to obtain a free library card from the Jasper County Public Library.

References
 U.S. Board on Geographic Names (GNIS)
 United States Census Bureau cartographic boundary files

External links
 Indiana Township Association
 United Township Association of Indiana

Townships in Jasper County, Indiana
Townships in Indiana